Kyzh is the name of several rural localities in Russia:
Kyzh (village), a village in Dobryansky District, Perm Krai
Kyzh (settlement), a settlement in Dobryansky District, Perm Krai